Ankhesenpaaten Tasherit (or Ankhesenpaaten-ta-sherit, “Ankhesenpaaten the Younger”) was an ancient Egyptian princess of the 18th Dynasty.
Ankhesenpaaten Tasherit and another princess, Meritaten Tasherit are two princesses who appear in scenes dating to the later part of the reign of Akhenaten. The titles of at least one of the princess is of the form "[...-ta]sherit, born of [...], born of the King's Great Wife [...]. The inscription is damaged and the name of the mother and grandmother of the princesses has not been preserved. Ankhesenpaaten Tasherit has been known to archaeologists since 1938, when a talatat block with her picture and name was found in Hermopolis.

Proposed parents
Several different sets of parents have been proposed for Ankhesenpaaten Tasherit (as well as Meritaten Tasherit).

Ankhesenpaaten and Akhenaten
She is most commonly held to have been the daughter of Ankhesenpaaten (a daughter of Pharaoh Akhenaten) and Akhenaten himself. The title of the princess is thought to have been "Ankhesenpaaten-tasherit, born of Ankhesenpaaten, born of the King's Great Wife Nefertiti". If we assume that Ankhesenpaaten Tasherit was the daughter of Ankhesenpaaten and Akhenaten, she must have been born towards the very end of Akhenaten's reign. Since Ankhesenpaaten was born around the 5th year of her father's reign, the earliest year  she could have had a child was around Year 16 of his reign.

Kiya and Akhenaten
Since both Ankhesenpaaten Tasherit and another princess, Meritaten Tasherit appear only in texts that once mentioned Akhenaten's second wife Kiya, it is also possible that they were children of Akhenaten and Kiya, or that they were fictional, replacing the name of Kiya's daughter, who might have been Beketaten, more commonly thought to be Tiye's child.

Meritaten and Smenkhare
Dodson proposed Ankhesenpaaten Tasherit was a daughter of the young royal couple Meritaten and Smenkhare. The young princess would have been named after Meritaten's sister.

References

Princesses of the Eighteenth Dynasty of Egypt
14th-century BC Egyptian women
Akhenaten